Iraqi Moaveds are a group of 350,000-650,000 Iraqi Persians who were deported from Iraq by the Ba'ath dictatorship because of their Iranian ancestry. Thousands of Shi'ah of Iranian origin but whose families had resided for generations in the Shi'ah religious centers of Karbala and Najaf, were expelled from Iraq, in the early 1970s  and before Iran-Iraq war. The exact number of this group is not clear and ranging from 350,000 to 650,000. Many of them who could prove an Iranian origin in the court get Iranian citizenship (400,000) and some of them returned to Iraq after Saddam.

Many Iraqi Moaveds hold or have held high positions in the government of Islamic Republic of Iran such as Shahroudi (head of Judicial system of Iran), General Mohammad Reza Naqdi (commander of the Basij paramilitary force), Hamid-Reza Assefi and Ali Akbar Salehi (Minister of Foreign Affairs).

See also
Iranians in Iraq
Iraqis in Iran
Arab-Persians

References

Iran
Iran–Iraq relations
Iranian people of Iraqi descent